Dr. Samar Mubarakmand (b. 17 September 1942), is a Pakistani nuclear physicist known for his research in gamma spectroscopy and experimental development of the linear accelerator.

He came to public attention as the director of the test teams responsible for the performing the Pakistan's first atomic tests (see Chagai-I and Chagai-II) at the Ras Koh Hills, located in Balochistan Province, Pakistan. Prior to that, he was the project director of the Pakistani missile research and development program and supervised development of the Shaheen-I ballistic missile, and the Babur cruise missile programs. Mubarakmand was the founding chairman of the National Engineering and Scientific Commission (Nescom) from 2001 until 2007. He was subsequently appointed by the Government of Pakistan to assist the Thar coalfield project. He is Voluntarily Heading the Mineral Exploration work in district Chiniot as Chairman Board of Directors Punjab Mineral Company, (M&M Deptt) Government of Punjab.

Biography

Early life and education
Samar Mubarakmand was born in Rawalpindi on 17 September 1942 to a Punjabi family from Hoshiarpur, East Punjab. He gained his education in Lahore and matriculated from St. Anthony's High School in 1956. After passing the university entrance exams, he enrolled at Government College University (GCU) where he studied physics under Dr. Tahir Hussain. In 1960, he graduated with a Bachelor of Science (BSc) in physics with a concentration in experimental physics and a minor in mathematics. During his college years, Mubarakmand was an avid swimmer and represented GCU at the National Games of Pakistan.

He conducted research in experimental physics under Dr. Hussain and built an experimental apparatus for his master's thesis. His thesis contained detailed work on gamma ray spectrometry and performed an experiment that was witnessed by nuclear physicist Denys Wilkinson as part of his master's program. Wilkinson spoke highly of his work and invited Mubarakmand to visit Oxford University in the United Kingdom to resume studies in experimental physics.

In 1962, Mubarakmand gained a Master of Science (MSc) in physics after publishing his thesis, "Construction of a gamma-ray spectrometer," under Hussain. In 1962, he joined the Pakistan Atomic Energy Commission (PAEC) and gained a scholarship to study at Oxford University. Recommended by Wilkinson, he was admitted there and joined the group led by Wilkinson. At Oxford Mubarakmand participated in preparing a 22 million volt particle accelerator and was part of the team that commissioned it.

During his time at Oxford, Mubarakmand learned about linear accelerators, and after returning to Pakistan he built one. Apart from studying, Mubarakamand played cricket and fast bowled for the Oxford University Cricket Club. In 1966, Mubarakmand completed his doctoral thesis under Wilkinson and was awarded a Doctor of Philosophy (DPhil) in experimental particle physics.

After returning to Pakistan, Mubarakmand rejoined PAEC, and also joined the faculty of GCU as an assistant professor of physics in 1966. From 1974 to 1977, he taught physics at GCU and  during his tenure as professor.

Pakistan Atomic Energy Commission (PAEC)

Upon returning to Pakistan, Mubarakmand did fundamental work on neutron spectroscopy but later moved on to the Pakistan Institute of Nuclear Science and Technology (PINSTECH) to do post-doctoral research and joined the physics department led by Dr. Naeem Ahmad Khan in 1966. In 1967, he joined the 'Nuclear Physics Group' (NPG) formed by Dr. Naeem Ahmad that consisted of Bashiruddin Mahmood and Hafeez Qureshi, a mechanical engineer.

At PAEC, Mubarakmand additionally worked towards applications involving chemical engineering where he built his reputation among his senior scientists. The NPG worked towards engineering problems involving reactor physics and methods involving gas centrifuges, but the group did not last long together when Qureshi went to join the Radiation and Isotope Applications Division (RIAD) in 1971.

1971 war and atomic bomb project

In January 1972, Mubarakmand was assigned to the Nuclear Physics Division (NPD), led by Dr. Ishfaq Ahmad, where he immersed himself in work on the physics calculations of implosion method nuclear weapons. After India announced the surprise 'Smiling Buddha' nuclear test in 1974, PAEC accelerated the program by establishing the Fast Neutron Physics Group (FNPG) on the advice of Abdus Salam. Munir Ahmad Khan made Mubarakmand its first director due to his expertise in chemical engineering and experimental physics. The FNPG generated work calculating the neutron temperature, neutron initiator, and helping design the neutron reflector.

During the same time, he collaborated with Hafeez Qureshi to assist in designing the tamper and further helped conclude the calculation of the neutron energy's distributive ranges and the power produced by the neutrons, after the detonation process. In 1973, Mubarakmand commenced the work on calculations involving the 'relativity of simultaneity'– a key concept involving investigating detonation of the weapon from several points at the same time.

In 1978, Mubarakmand built a linear particle accelerator at PINSTECH to conclude solutions in the neutron generator. He later witnessed the establishment of domestically developed supercomputer facilities at PINSTECH to help conduct the subcritical testing. Due to his foremost experience in experimental physics, Mubarakmand was appointed director of the Diagnostic Group– a secretive division at PAEC that was charged with conducting experimental tests of atomic weapons and responsible for the countdown of the detonation process. A comprehensive work of civil engineering that took place for potential tests sites was completed in a span of five to six years. A milestone was reached on 11 March 1983 when Mubarakmand led the testing teams to supervise the secretive Kirana-I, their first 'cold' test. Although the countdown and experiment was supervised by Mubarakmand, the blast effect was eventually determined by the Theoretical Physics Group.

In 1987, Mubarakmand was posted at the secretive Directorate for Technical Development (DTD)— a secret directorate that developed the explosive lenses and triggering mechanism for the fission weapon. He collaborated with Hafeez Qureshi and Zaman Sheikh. He once described them: "These (Engineering) people at DTD were really smart. They were trained very thoroughly in the development of a weapon's necessary materials at very low cost." After a 3-dimensional geological survey was completed in 1978, Mubarakmand first visited the Chagai Hills in 1981 with Ishfaq Ahmad and other scientists from divisions. In 1998, he was appointed as Member (Technical) at PAEC, and guided the Prime Minister Nawaz Sharif on experimental physics and test preparations. Mubarakmand assisted the government in evaluating the Pokhran-II tests conducted by India in 1998 and supervised test preparations at the Chagai. At the National Security Council's Cabinet Committee on National Security, Mubarakmand backed Dr. Abdul Qadeer Khan's strong advocacy for conducting the tests, immediately calling for the decision to test. On 19–20 May 1998, Mubarakmand led some 140 experimental physicists to oversee the preparations in Chagai, Balochistan, Pakistan where he personally supervised the complete assembly of all five nuclear devices. Mubarakmand walked a total of 5 km back and forth in the hot tunnels checking and re-checking the devices and cables which would be forever buried under the concrete. On 28 May 1998, Mubarakmand led the countdown of the tests, codename Chagai-I.
Samar Mubarakmand was called by PM Nawaz to Prime Minister House just after India conducted Pokhran II and PM Nawaz asked him the status of preparedness of Pakistan and (Mubarakmand) assured Prime Minister Nawaz that scientists were ready and Pakistan could go for its first nuclear test.

On 30 May 1998, Ishfaq Ahmad cleared with the Prime Minister, and Mubarakmand led the very small team of academic scientists that supervised the country's plutonium fission weapon – codename Chagai-II.

In 2005, Mubarakmand eulogised his memories in an interview with Hamid Mir's Capital Talk television show and said:

Recalling Munir Ahmad Khan and PAEC's role and its relation to the atomic bomb project priority dispute, Mubarakmand later said that:

Government work and political advocacy

Space programme

In 1990s, Mubarakmand took special initiatives in the advancement of the space program and led a team of engineers to successfully develop the Shaheen-I missile. He was the founding director of the National Defence Complex (NDC) bureau that initiated the work on the Shaheen-I and gathered support for the program. Necessary funding for the program was secured by the military. Mubarakmand oversaw the development of the solid-fuel rocket booster. Initiated in 1987 by the Pakistan Ministry of Defence in response to India's Integrated Guided Missile Development Programme, Pakistan's spin-off missile program was aggressively pursued by Prime Minister Benazir Bhutto in 1993. The Shaheen-I missile was successfully test fired in 1999 by a team of engineers led by Mubarakmand. Key strategic weapon systems, such as the Babur and Ghaznavi missiles, were also built by his team.

In 2008, Mubarakmand joined the Planning Commission of Pakistan where he strongly advocated for peaceful usage of their space program. In 2009, he revealed the work on Paksat-1R, the nation's first geostationary satellite that was launched in 2011.

The satellite was described as being able to monitor agricultural programs, minerals programs and weather conditions and quoted that there were sufficient funds for the defence, nuclear and space programs. The satellite was launched in 2011 from  the Xichang Satellite Launch Centre in China. His relations with Dr. Abdul Qadeer Khan often remained tense over several scientific issues. He sees Dr. Mubarakmand as "no authority over materials as he is an expert on electromagnetism."

Thar Coal project

In 2013, Mubarakmand assisted the Provincial Government of Balochistan in mineral extraction. He lobbied heavily for the implementation of the Thar coal project initiated by the Provincial Government of Sindh despite strong public criticism by Abdul Qadeer Khan, which described it as "intellectual dishonesty". In 2015, a breakthrough in the Thar coal project was reported by the media.

Misstatements

The Tethyan Cooper Company (TCC) has approached the High Court of Justice in the British Virgin Islands for the enforcement of the $5.97 billion award against Pakistan by the International Centre for Settlement of Investment Disputes (ICSID) in the Reko Diq case in Dec-20.

A senior official revealed that the "misstatement" of scientist, Dr Samar Mubarakmand before the Supreme Court tribunal,  in 2011, was one of the main reasons behind the Supreme Court Decision On 7 January 2013, when a three-member bench of the apex court, headed by then Chief Justice Iftikhar Muhammad Chaudhry, declared Chejva "illegal, void" and non-binding, causing ICSID slapping the heavy penalty on Pakistan. Dr Samar had claimed that the Reko Diq gold mines would fetch the country around $2.5 billion annually. He had also maintained Reko Diq and other gold reserves in the country will bring in $131 billion to the national exchequer. The tribunal relied on his statement.

State honours

Mubarakmand has been conferred with state honors for his services to the country by the Government of Pakistan. He is the recipient of the: Sitara-e-Imtiaz (1993); Hilal-e-Imtiaz (1998); and the Nishan-e-Imtiaz (2003), which is the highest civil honor of Pakistan. In addition, he is a Fellow of the Pakistan Academy of Sciences (PAS), inducted by Dr. Ishfaq Ahmad in 2000.

Nishan-e-Imtiaz (2004) 
Hilal-e-Imtiaz (1998)
Sitara-e-Imtiaz (1993)
PAS Nazir Ahmad Award (2005)
International Scientist of the Year (2007)
Life Member, Pakistan Nuclear Society
Roll of Honour GCU (1962)
Fellow, Pakistan Mathematical Society (2003)

Scientific journals and papers

Conference papers
 "A Science Oddyssey: Pakistans Nuclear Emergence", Samar Mubarakmand, Khalil Qureshi, Masoor Beg, Masud Ahmad.

Research publications
 Aspects of a-emission from the bombardment of 58Ni with 14.7 MeV neutrons, by Naeem Ahmad Khan, Samar Mubarakmand and Masud Ahmed, journal of Nuclear physics, PINSTECH.
Cross-section measurements with a neutron generator by Samar Mubarakmand, Masud Ahmad, M. Anwar and M. S. Chaudhry.
Some characteristic differences between the etch pits due to 86Rn and 232 Th α particles in CA80–15 and LR–115 cellulose nitrate track detectors, by Hameed Ahmad Khan, M. Afzal, P. Chaudhary, Samar Mubarakmand, F. I. Nagi and A.Waheed, journal of Isotopic Radiation, PINSTECH (1977).
Application of glass solid state nuclear track detectors in the measurement of the + particle fission cross–section of uranium, by Samar Mubarakmand, K. Rashid, P. Chaudhry and Hameed Ahmad Khan, Methods of Nuclear Instrumentation. (1977)
Etching of glass solid state nuclear track detectors in aqueous solutions of (4NH)2HF, NaOH and KOH, by Hameed Ahmad Khan, R. A. Akbar, A. Waheed, P. Chaudhry and Samar Mubarakmand, journal of Isotopic Radiation, PINSTECH (1978).

See also
Pakistan and weapons of mass destruction
Shaheen (missile)
Chagai-I
Chagai-II
Kirana Hills

References

Biographical annotations
*

External links
Samar Mubarakmand
 http://cerncourier.com/cws/article/cern/28142/1/people11_12-99
 https://web.archive.org/web/20090507090152/http://www.ciitlahore.edu.pk/PL/News/VisitDrSamar110209.html

Living people
1942 births
Punjabi people
Pashtun people
People from Rawalpindi
Government College University, Lahore alumni
Alumni of the University of Oxford
Pakistani nuclear physicists
Experimental physicists
Project-706 people
Fluid dynamicists
Fellows of Pakistan Academy of Sciences
Academic staff of the Government College University, Lahore
St. Anthony's High School, Lahore alumni
Nuclear weapons scientists and engineers